Sophisticated Giant is a jazz album by saxophonist Dexter Gordon recorded in 1977 by an eleven-piece band playing tunes arranged by trombone player Slide Hampton. The album marked Gordon's return to the United States after a long residency in Europe.

Reception

AllMusic reviewer Scott Yanow awarded the album 4 stars and called it "An excellent acquisition."

Track listing

Side one
 "Laura" (David Raksin) – 7:37
 "The Moontrane" (Woody Shaw) – 6:36
 "Red Top" (Lionel Hampton, Ben Kynard) – 8:51

Side two
"Fried Bananas" (Dexter Gordon) – 7:53
"You're Blasé" (Ord Hamilton, Bruce Sievier) – 9:49
"How Insensitive" (Antônio Carlos Jobim, Vinícius de Moraes) – 4:53
All tunes arranged by Slide Hampton
Recorded June 21 & 22, 1977 at Sound Ideas, NYC by William Wittman

Personnel
Dexter Gordon — tenor and soprano saxophone
Frank Wess — alto saxophone, flute, piccolo
Woody Shaw — trumpet, flugelhorn
Benny Bailey — lead trumpet, flugelhorn
Slide Hampton — trombone
Wayne Andre — lead trombone
Howard Johnson — tuba, baritone saxophone
Bobby Hutcherson — vibes
George Cables — piano
Rufus Reid — bass
Victor Lewis — drums
Technical
William Wittman — engineer, recording, mixing

References

1977 albums
Dexter Gordon albums
Albums produced by Michael Cuscuna
Columbia Records albums